The following is a list of events affecting Philippine television in 2000. Events listed include television show debuts, finales, cancellations, and channel launches, closures and rebrandings, as well as information about controversies and carriage disputes.

Events

January
 January 1 - ABS-CBN launched ELJ Communications Center, the new corporate headquarters located in Quezon City's South Triangle.

February
 February 25 - Radio Philippines Network celebrated its 40th anniversary.

March
 March 1 
 GMA Network celebrated its 50th anniversary.
 IBC 13 celebrated its 40th anniversary.

June
 June 14 - GMA Network Center, the new headquarters of GMA Network, was inaugurated in the celebration of its 50th anniversary.
 June 19 - ABC 5 celebrated its 40th anniversary.

December
 December 8 - Rolling coverage of the impeachment trial of President Joseph Estrada on all television stations begins.

Unknown
 DOMSAT became a subsidiary of Solar Entertainment Corporation (Solar). As its subsidiary, DOMSAT's teleport is being used by Solar to produce, originate, and distribute its various television program services. Its full service digital broadcast teleport features server technology in Barangay Sta. Cruz, Sumulong Highway, Antipolo, Rizal. It is built around two encoder platforms, Scientific Atlanta Power Vu Classic (DVB) and Motorola Digicipher II (MPEG-@). Program origination is done on a SeaChange Media Cluster Server System. The facility includes a 500 square meter studio and various linear and non-linear production bays. Solar Entertainment first launched its namesake entertainment cable channel in the early 2000s, one devoted to American programs. This channel was later known as Solar USA (the acronym stands for "Ultimate in Suspense and Action"), and then later simply as USA before it was replaced by two separate channels.

Premieres

Unknown dates
 January: Gintong Pangarap on ABC 5

Unknown

 For Kids Only on RPN 9
 Metro TV on RPN 9
 Ikaw at ang Batas on RPN 9
 Pan sa Kinabuhi on RPN 9
 Tapatan with Jay Sonza on RPN 9
 Jai Alai: The Game of a Thousand Thrills on PTV 4
 Battle of the Brains on PTV 4
 Barangay Dos on ABS-CBN 2
 Kontrapelo on ABS-CBN 2
 Feel at Home on ABS-CBN 2
 Pahina on ABS-CBN 2
 Star Studio Presents on ABS-CBN 2
 Isyu 101 on ABS-CBN 2
 Pinoy Exposèd on ABS-CBN 2
 Citizens Patrol on IBC 13
 Golf Power on IBC 13
 A Taste of Life with Heny Sison on IBC 13
 Now Showing on IBC 13
 Thursday Night at the Movies on IBC 13
 Viva Proudly Presents on IBC 13
 Out of Time on UNTV 37
 GMA Drama Studio Presents on GMA 7
 Kahit Na Magtiis on GMA 7
 May Himala on GMA 7
 What Went Wrong? on GMA 7
 Super Banks on GMA 7
 Ecclesia In Asia: Ang Misa on GMA 7
 Gadget Boy & Heather on GMA 7
 Recess (Disney Adventures) on GMA 7
 SBN Music Videos on SBN 21
 Kids Against Crime on ZOE TV 11
 Kids Club on ZOE TV 11
 Batang Kaharian on ETV 39
 Niño Felipin on ABS-CBN 2
 Business Nightly on ANC
 Fashion Emergency on E! Philippines
 E! Search Party on E! Philippines
 Wild On on E! Philippines
 Extreme Close Up on E! Philippines
 TV Patrol Chavacano on ABS-CBN TV-3 Zamboanga
 TV Patrol Socsksargen on ABS-CBN TV-3 General Santos

Programs transferring networks

Finales
 January 7: Chabelita (ABS-CBN 2)
 January 8:
 Fastbreak (IBC 13)
 Back to Iskul Bukol (IBC 13)
 Wow! (IBC 13)
 February 18: IBC Balita Ngayon (IBC 13)
 March 27: Liwanag ng Hatinggabi (GMA 7)
 April 28: TV Patrol Cagayan De Oro (ABS-CBN TV-4 Cagayan de Oro)
 May 29: Tago Ka Na! (GMA 7)
 June 10: Tarajing Potpot (ABS-CBN 2)
 June 30:
 Arangkada Ulat sa Tanghali (RPN 9)
 TV Patrol Cebu (ABS-CBN TV-3 Cebu)
 RPN NewsWatch Primetime Edition (RPN 9)
 RPN NewsWatch Prime Cast (RPN 9)
 July 26: Compañero y Compañera (GMA 7)
 August 28: Umulan Man o Umaraw (GMA 7)
 August 30: Rosalinda (ABS-CBN 2) 
 September 2: Pintados (GMA 7)
 September 28: May Bukas Pa (IBC 13)
 November 3: Alas Dose sa Trese (IBC 13)
 November 10: Labs Ko Si Babe (ABS-CBN 2)
 November 17: Pulso: Aksyon Balita (ABS-CBN 2)
 November 24: TV Patrol Baguio (ABS-CBN TV-3 Baguio)
 November 27: Munting Anghel (GMA 7)
 December 2: Oki Doki Doc (ABS-CBN 2)
 December 30: Dong Puno Live (ABS-CBN 2)

Unknown
 Cyberkada on ABS-CBN 2
 Yaiba on ABS-CBN 2
 Bantay Bata, The Series on ABS-CBN 2
 For Kids Only on ABS-CBN 2
 Hour of Truth on ABS-CBN 2
 May Himala on GMA 7
 Ooops! on GMA 7
 Bitoy's Adventures in Bilibkaba? on GMA 7
 Comedy Central Market on GMA 7
 Koko Kwik Kwak on GMA 7
 Codename: Verano on GMA 7
 Super Klenk on GMA 7
 Super Banks on GMA 7
 Music Video Features on GMA 7
 TV Shopper on GMA 7
 Kontak 5 on ABC 5
 Skin Deep on ABC 5
 Sky Ranger Gavan on ABC 5
 Janperson on ABC 5
 Jetman on ABC 5
 Lingkod Bayan ni Tony Falcon on IBC 13
 Jeep ni Erap on PTV 4
 Online Bingo Filipino on PTV 4
 Ang Dating Daan on PTV 4
 Kapag May Katwiran, Ipaglaban Mo! on RPN 9
 Family Kuarta o Kahon on RPN 9
 Business Class on RPN 9
 Uncle Bob's Children's Show on RPN 9
 Tokshow With Mr. Shooli on RPN 9
 Tipong Pinoy on RPN 9
 Junior Newswatch on RPN 9
 Goggle V on RPN 9
 PBA Classics on Net 25
 Shop at Home on ZOE TV 11
 TV Patrol Zamboanga on ABS-CBN TV-3 Zamboanga
 TV Patrol General Santos on ABS-CBN TV-3 General Santos

Networks

Launches

 January 15 - Disney Channel (Southeast Asia)

Unknown (dates)
 The Q Channel (then ACQ-KBN and ACQ-KBN Sonshine; now SMNI)

Births
February 15 - Angeli Nicole Sanoy, actress
February 23 - Lexi Gonzales, actress
February 26 - Alexa Ilacad, actress
March 1 - Nikki Samonte, actress, singer and model
March 2 - Bianca Umali, actress and model
March 12 - Sabrina Man, actress
March 15 - Aaliyah Benisano, actress
April 21 - Taki Saito, actress and dancer
April 23
 Gillian Vicencio, actress and dancer
 Fatima Louise Lagueras, singer
May 4 - Angel Sy, actress
July 15 - Edward Barber, actor and model
July 22 - Kaori Oinuma, actress
August 3 - 
Kira Balinger, actress
Vivoree Esclito, actress and dancer
August 11 - Nathaniel Britt, actor
August 21 - Kate Valdez, actress and model
September 3 - AJ Raval, actress
September 16 - Therese Malvar, actress
September 17 - Edray Teodoro, singer and actress
October 9 - Angelic Guzman, actress
October 26 - Mika Salamanca, vlogger
November 22 - Ayeesha Cervantes, actress
November 28 - Jacob Rica, actor and model
December 31 - Gello Marquez, actor, singer, vlogger and model

Deaths
 December 4 – Tito Arévalo, Filipino actor and musician (born 1914)

Unknown
Jun Aristorenas, Filipino actor, director, dancer, producer and writer (born 1933)

See also
2000 in television

References

 
Television in the Philippines by year
Philippine television-related lists